The National Capital Transportation Agency (NCTA)  was created in 1960 by President Dwight D. Eisenhower to comprehensively plan different modes of transportation in the Washington, D.C. area.  John F. Kennedy appointed Darwin Stolzenbach as administrator of the NCTA, which laid the groundwork for the Washington Metro System.

References

Transportation planning
Organizations based in Washington, D.C.